Eucalyptus cretata, commonly known as Darke Peak mallee or chalky mallee, is a species of mallee or, rarely, a small, straggly tree and is endemic to a restricted part of South Australia. It has smooth whitish and grey bark, lance-shaped adult leaves, glaucous flower buds in groups of seven, white flowers and cup-shaped to barrel-shaped or conical fruit.

Description
The bark is smooth, grey over coppery underbark, shedding in ribbons, and the branchlets are shiny red or brownish green and glaucous. Flowering occurs spasmodically and the flowers are white.

Taxonomy and naming
Eucalyptus cretata was first formally described in 1990 by Peter Lang and Ian Brooker from a specimen collected by Lang near Darke Peak in 1989. The description was published in the Journal of the Adelaide Botanic Gardens. The specific epithet (cretata) is a Latin word meaning "marked with chalk", referring to the chalky bloom on the branchlets and flower buds.

Distribution and habitat
Darke Peak mallee grow in mallee communities on the central Eyre Peninsula, between Caralue Bluff Conservation Park, Lock and Cowell.

References

cretata
Myrtales of Australia
Trees of Australia
Flora of South Australia
Taxa named by Ian Brooker
Plants described in 1990